Archbishop Mar Jacques Ishaq (born February 25, 1938) is a Catholic cleric who formerly served as Curial Bishop of the Patriarchate of Babylon, Iraq, of the Chaldean Catholic Church. He served as locum tenens of the Patriarch of Babylon of the Chaldeans between the retirement of Emmanuel III Delly in December 2012 and the election of Louis Raphaël I Sako in January 2013.

Biography
Jacques Ishaq was born at Mosul, Kingdom of Iraq on February 25, 1938, and was ordained priest on June 20, 1963. On May 7, 1997, he was appointed Archbishop of Erbil he was consecrated bishop on September 26, 1997, by Patriarch Mar Raphael I Bidawid, Archbishop André Sana, and Bishop Emmanuel Delly. He retired on May 4, 1999.

On December 21, 2005, he was appointed Titular Archbishop of Nisibis dei Caldei and Curial Bishop of the Patriarchate of Babylon.

Upon the retirement of Patriarch Mar Emmanuel III Delly, he served as locum tenens of the Patriarchate of Babylon of the Chaldeans until the election of Patriarch Louis Raphaël I Sako. In 2014 he retired as Curial Bishop of Babylon.

External links

Profile at gcatholic.org

1938 births
Living people
Chaldean bishops
Chaldean archbishops
Iraqi Eastern Catholics
Iraqi Assyrian people
People from Mosul